Davis Murwendo (born 25 May 1998) is a Zimbabwean cricketer. He made his first-class debut for Rising Stars in the 2017–18 Logan Cup on 19 April 2018. He made his List A debut on 4 February 2020, for Rangers in the 2019–20 Pro50 Championship. In December 2020, he was selected to play for the Rhinos in the 2020–21 Logan Cup.

References

External links
 

1998 births
Living people
Zimbabwean cricketers
Place of birth missing (living people)
Rangers cricketers
Rising Stars cricketers